Amy Elizabeth Biehl (April 26, 1967 – August 25, 1993) was an American graduate of Stanford University and an anti-Apartheid activist in South Africa who was murdered by Cape Town residents while a black mob shouted anti-white slurs. The four men convicted of her murder were pardoned by the Truth and Reconciliation Commission.

Background
Biehl was a student at the University of the Western Cape in Cape Town as a scholar in the Fulbright Program.

Death
As she drove three friends home to the township of Gugulethu, outside Cape Town, on August 25, 1993, a mob pulled her from the car and stabbed and stoned her to death. The attack on the car driven by her was one of many incidents of general lawlessness on the N1 highway that afternoon. Bands of toyi-toying youths threw stones at delivery vehicles and cars driven by white people. One delivery vehicle was toppled over and set alight, and only the arrival of the police prevented more damage. There was evidence that some of the possessions belonging to her and the passengers were stolen.

According to Rex van Schalkwyk, in his 1998 book One Miracle Is Not Enough, "Supporters of the three men accused of murdering [her]… burst out laughing in the public gallery of the Supreme Court today when a witness told how the battered woman groaned in pain." (pp. 188–89.) Four people were convicted of killing her.

Pardons
In 1998, all were pardoned by South Africa's Truth and Reconciliation Commission, when they stated that their actions had been politically motivated.

Biehl's family supported the release of the men. Her father shook their hands and stated,

Legacy
In 1994, Biehl's parents, Linda and Peter, founded the Amy Biehl Foundation Trust to develop and empower youth in the townships, in order to discourage further violence. Two of the men who had been convicted of her murder worked for the foundation as part of its programs. In 1999, Biehl's parents were honored with the Aline and Norman Felton Humanitarian Award.

In his speech accepting the Congressional Gold Medal on 23 September 1998, Nelson Mandela said:

On August 25, 2010, on the 17th anniversary of Biehl's death, a bronze plaque mounted on a stone was unveiled by the U.S. Ambassador, Donald Gips, and Biehl's mother, Linda Biehl, at the Cape Town site where she was killed.

The novel Mother to Mother by Sindiwe Magona refers to Amy Biehl's death from the perspective of the mother of one of Biehl's killers.

August 25, 2013, marked the 20th anniversary of Amy Biehl's death and a ceremony was held at the Cape Town site where she was killed in Gugulethu.

Amy Biehl High School in Albuquerque, New Mexico is named in her honor. Amy Biehl Community School at Rancho Viejo in Santa Fe, New Mexico is also named after her.

Biehl's uncle was teacher Dale Shewalter.

References

Further reading

External links

Amy Biehl Foundation USA
Amy Foundation (South Africa)

1967 births
1993 deaths
American people murdered abroad
Deaths by stabbing in South Africa
Hate crimes
1993 murders in South Africa
Violence against women in South Africa
People from Newport Beach, California
People murdered in South Africa
Racially motivated violence against European Americans
Racially motivated violence against white people in Africa
Stanford University alumni
University of the Western Cape alumni
Female murder victims
Newport Harbor High School alumni